Emilie Halpern is an American conceptualist artist.  She works in ceramics, sculpture, room installations, film, photography and drawing.

Personal life and education
Emilie's father is an immunologist at Stanford University  She originally had an interest in science, but turned to art.  Her maternal grandfather Takanori Oguiss was a painter and has his own museum.   Her paternal grandfather was Russian and exiled to Siberia in the czar's anti-semitic purges. In addition to her art, Emilie teaches a fourth grade class in art.

Work

Emilie's work “Drown” is a haunting piece where once a day, 4 liters of ocean water are poured onto a concrete floor and allowed to evaporate.  4 liters is the volume that fills a person's lungs.

Emilie's work “Shōka” is an ikebana style installation in three parts.  The first part, 地 (pronounced chi, translated as "earth") is an installation of phosphorescent rocks with a minimalist layout.  During the day the rocks are nondescript.  At night, the rocks are illuminated with a black light so they glow.  The second part called 天 (pronounced ten, translated as "heaven") shows the areas of the gallery walls illuminated by the sun covered in gold foil.  The third part called 人 (pronounced jin, translated as "human") are series of glazed ceramics white with blue shading hanging from the ceiling and arranged on a long block of wood.  Maxwell Williams of KCET described these installations as without theatrics, but leaving “a long lasting residue in the viewers mind”

See also
Robert Smithson

References

Living people
1976 births
Artists from Los Angeles
American contemporary artists
American people of Russian-Jewish descent
American potters
Jewish American artists
Modern artists
Women potters
Sculptors from California
21st-century ceramists
American women ceramists
American ceramists
American women sculptors
21st-century American Jews
21st-century American women
Skowhegan School of Painting and Sculpture alumni